Kaʿb al-Aḥbār (full name Abū Isḥāq Kaʿb ibn Maniʿ al-Ḥimyarī was a 7th-century Yemenite Jew from the Arab tribe of "Dhī Raʿīn" who converted to Islam. He was considered to be the earliest authority on Israiliyyat and South Arabian lore. According to Islamic tradition, he accompanied Umar in his trip from Medina to Jerusalem, and afterwards, became a supporter of Uthman. He died in Hims around 652-6AD.

Name
Aḥbār is the plural of ḥibr/ḥabr, from the Hebrew ḥāver, a scholarly title referring to a rank immediately below rabbi as used by Babylonian Jews.

Biography
Little is known about Ka'b, but according to tradition, he came to Medina during the reign of Umar. He then accompanied Umar in his voyage to Jerusalem. It is reported that when Umar marched into Jerusalem with an army, he asked Ka‘b: "Where do you advise me to build a place of worship?" Ka‘b indicated the Temple Rock, now a gigantic heap of ruins from the temple of Jupiter. The Jews, Ka‘b explained, had briefly won back their old capital a quarter of a century before (when Persians overran Syria), but they had not had time to clear the site of the Temple, for the Byzantines (Rūm) had recaptured the city. It was then that Umar ordered the rubbish on the Temple Rock to be removed by the Nabataeans, and after three showers of heavy rain had cleansed the Rock, he instituted prayers there. Umar is said to have fenced it and, some years later, the Umayyad Caliph Abd al-Malik built the Dome of the Rock over the site as an integral part of the Aqsa compound. Until this day, the place is known as Qubbat al-Ṣakhra (the Dome of the Rock).

According to tradition, Ka‘b believed that "Every event that has taken place or will take place on any foot of the earth, is written in the Tourat (Torah), which God revealed to his Prophet Moses". He is said to have predicted the death of Umar using the Torah. According to one narration, Ka‘b told Umar "you ought to write your will because you will die in three days." Umar responded "I do not feel any pain or sickness". Abu Lulu assassinated Umar two days later.

After Umar's death, Ka‘b vigorously supported Uthman. Subsequently, governor Mu'awiya asked Ka'b to become his counsel in Damascus, but he most likely chose to withdraw to Hims, where he died in 652-6 AD, according to various accounts. His burial place is disputed.

According to Shia sources Ka‘ab was a Jewish rabbi, who moved from Yemen to Bilad al-Sham (Syria). He was of the clan of Dhu Ra'in or Dhu al-Kila. Ka‘b came to Medina during the time of Umar where he converted to Islam. He lived there until Uthman's era.

Sunni view
Ibn Hajar Asqalani, a 14th-century Sunni Shafi'i scholar, wrote,
Ka`b Ibn Mati` al-Himyari, Abu Ishaq, known as Ka`b al-Ahbar, is trustworthy (thiqah). He belongs to the 2nd [tabaqah]. He lived during both Jahiliyyah and Islam. He lived in Yemen before he moved to Sham [~Syria]. He died during the Caliphate of `Uthman exceeding 100 years of age. None of his reports are in al-Bukhari. He has one narration in Muslim from Abu Huraira from him on the authority of al-A`mash from Abu Salih.

Al-Tabari quoted intensively about Ka'b in his History of the Prophets and Kings. Other Sunni authors also mention Ka'b and his stories with Caliphs Umar, Uthman and Muawiyah.

On a website operated and owned by the Ministry of Awqaf and Islamic Affairs (Qatar) of the State of Qatar, one may find a fatwa on Ka’b al-Ahbar.

Mention in hadith canons
Ka'b al-Ahbar is mentioned in some hadith canons such as Sahih Muslim and Muwatta Malik, etc. A hadith reports that the Caliph Umar ibn al-Khattab appointed him personally an amir over Muslims.

Twelver Shi'a view
Within the Shia tradition Ka'b is seen as an unreliable figure. Muhammad al-Tijani a 20th-century Shi'a scholar writes that "He was a Jew from Yemen who pretended to have embraced Islam then went to Medina during the reign of Umar ibn al-Khattab." Muhammad Jawad Chirri writes, after having quoted a hadith, "This dialogue should alert us to the deceptive and successful attempt on the part of Ka'b to influence future events by satanic suggestions. It contains a great deal of deception which produced many harmful results to Islam and the Muslims." Ka'b's influence is deprecated within the Shia tradition of Islam.

Accusation of Jewish bias
He has been accused in some traditions of introducing Jewish elements into Islam. For example, Abd Allah ibn Abbas disputed a view attributed to Ka'ab that "on the day of the judgement the sun and the moon will be brought forth like two stupefied bulls and thrown to hell". According to Al-Tabari, Ibn Abbas responded "Kaab has uttered an untruth!" three times, quoting the Quran that the sun and moon are obedient to Allah. He accused Ka'b of trying to introduce Jewish myths into Islam.

Jewish-Christian legends
According to 19th-century , he is associated with the development of the Sunni tradition. Liran Yagdar of Yale University said that Ka'b did not have much influence on Sunni tradition and states "Christians and Jews adopted Ka'b into their legends on the emergence of Islam, wishing to refute the credibility of the Quran by referring to Jewish converts such as Ka'b who corrupted Kaa scripture from within".

See also
Abdullah ibn Saba'

References

Tabi‘un
Tabi‘un hadith narrators
Isra'iliyyat narrators
Yemenite Jews
Converts to Islam from Judaism
650s deaths
Year of birth unknown
Place of birth unknown
7th-century Arabs
Converts to Islam
7th-century Jews